Young Social Democrats Federation (pl. Federacja Młodych Socjaldemokratów) - Polish youth organisation focused on social democracy, associated with Democratic Left Alliance. Organisation brings together young people who has left political views.

History 
Young Social Democrats Federation was established in 2003. It was made of two others left youth organisations - Young Left Alliance and Young Democratic Left Association. In 2006 they signed agreement with other left youth organisations in Poland. In 2014 and 2018 they joined SLD Lewica Razem election committee and presented their candidates in local votings.

Program 

Organisation is focused on social democracy, social equality and justice, and green politics. Young Social Democrats Federation opposes fascism, xenophobia, intolerance and breaking human rights. The organisation supports proeuropean and anti-clericalism politics.

Leaders 

 Grzegorz Pietruczuk (2004–2008)
 Marceli Zaborek (2008–2010)
 Paulina Piechna-Więckiewicz (2010–2012)
 Grzegorz Gruchalski (2012–2014)
 Maciej Onasz (2014–2016)
 Błażej Makarewicz (2016–2018)
 Adam Wojech (2018-2020)
 Artur Jaskulski  (since 2020)

References 

Youth organisations based in Poland
Youth wings of political parties in Poland
Social democratic organizations
Democratic Left Alliance
Anti-clerical parties
2003 establishments in Poland